Liam Gaffney (22 June 1911 – July 1994) was an Irish stage, film and television actor. His stage work included appearances with Dublin's Abbey Theatre, and in London's West End.

Selected filmography
 Irish and Proud of It (1936)
 Macushla (1937)
 The Londonderry Air (1938)
 The Villiers Diamond (1938)
 The Four Just Men (1939)
 The Parnell Commission (1939, TV film)
 Dr. O'Dowd (1940)
 Captain Boycott (1947)
 The Bad Lord Byron (1949)
 The Case of Charles Peace (1949)
 The Lady with the Lamp  (1951)
 Curtain Up (1952)
 My Death Is a Mockery (1952)
 Women of Twilight (1952)
 Mantrap (1953)
 Street of Shadows (1953)
 Rooney (1958)
 Jazz Boat (1960)
 The Trials of Oscar Wilde (1960)
 Island of Terror (1966)

References

External links

1911 births
1994 deaths
Irish male stage actors
Irish male film actors
20th-century Irish male actors
Irish expatriates in the United Kingdom